A barrel is a cylindrical container, traditionally made with wooden material.

Barrel may also refer to:

 BARREL (Balloon Array for RBSP Relativistic Electron Losses), a NASA mission
 Barrel (album), a 1970 album by Lee Michaels
 Barrel (horology), a watch component
 Barrel (unit), several units of volume
 Barrel (wine), for fermenting or ageing wine
 Barrel (fastener), a simple hinge consisting of a barrel and a pivot
 Gun barrel
 the venturi of a carburetor
 a component of a clarinet
 a component of a snorkel
 a tank in Harry Turtledove's books; see Victoria: An Empire Under the Sun
 the outside of a low voltage DC connector
 "The Barrel", a song by Aldous Harding from her 2019 album Designer

See also
 Barrel roll (disambiguation)
 
 Barrell, a surname
 Barrow (disambiguation)
 Beryl (disambiguation)
 Keg

sl:Sod